Alfio Quarteroni (30 May 1952) is an Italian mathematician.

He is Professor of Numerical Analysis at the Politecnico of Milan (Italy), since 1989 and has been the director of the Chair of Modelling and Scientific Computing at the EPFL (Swiss Federal Institute of Technology), Lausanne (Switzerland), from 1998 until 2017. He is the founder (and first director) of MOX at Politecnico of Milan (2002) and MATHICSE at EPFL, Lausanne (2010). He is co-founder (and President) of MOXOFF, a spin-off company at Politecnico of Milan (2010).

He is member of the Italian Academy of Science (Accademia Nazionale dei Lincei), the European Academy of Science, the Academia Europaea, the Lisbon Academy of Sciences, and the Istituto Lombardo Accademia di Scienze e Lettere.

He is author of 26 books (some of them translated into up to 7 languages), editor of 8 books, author of about 400 papers published in international Scientific Journals and Conference Proceedings, member of the editorial board of 25 International Journals, and Editor in Chief of two book series published by Springer.

He has been an invited or plenary speaker in more than 300 International Conferences and Academic Departments, in particular he has been plenary speaker at ICM 2006 in Madrid.

Among his awards and honors are: the NASA Group Achievement Award for the pioneering work in Computational Fluid Dynamics in 1992, the Fanfullino della Riconoscenza 2006, Città di Lodi, the Premio Capo D'Orlando 2006, the Ghislieri prize, 2013, the International Galileo Galilei prize for Sciences 2015. He is recipient of the Galileian Chair from the Scuola Normale Superiore, Pisa, Italy, 2001, doctor Honoris Causa in Naval Engineering from University of Trieste, Italy, 2003, SIAM Fellow (first row) since 2009, IACM (International Association of Computational Mechanics) Fellow since 2004, honorary fellow of ECCOMAS since 2015, the Courant Lectures 2010, the Euler Lecture 2017, the Russell Marker Lectures 2018, the Pedro Nunes Lectures 2018, the Euler Medal from Eccomas (2021-22), the Lagrange Prize from ICIAM (2020-23). He is a Professor Emeritus at EPFL since 2018.

He has been a member of the IMU Fields Medal Committee for ICM (the International Congress of Mathematicians) 2022.

He is the recipient of the ERC Advanced Grant for the project "MATHCARD" in 2008, of two ERC PoC (Proof of Concept) grants: "Math2Ward" in 2012 and "Math4AAARisk" in 2015, and of another ERC Advanced Grant for the project "iHEART" in 2017."

His research interests concern Mathematical Modelling, Numerical Analysis, Scientific Computing, and application to fluid mechanics, environment, geophysics, medicine, and the improvement of sports performance. He has been the director of 60 Phd students. His research Group at EPFL has contributed to the preliminary design of Solar Impulse, the Swiss long-range experimental solar-powered aircraft project, and has carried out the mathematical simulation for the optimization of performances of the Alinghi yacht, the winner of two editions (2003 and 2007) of the America’s Cup.

In 2022 he was ranked n.48 in the Top Scientist-Mathematics from research.com, n.1 in Italy.

References 

1952 births
Living people
Italian mathematicians
Swiss mathematicians
Place of birth missing (living people)
Members of the Lisbon Academy of Sciences